The Adams Cup was awarded annually (from 1964 to 1984) to the championship team in Central Professional Hockey League (CPHL).

The CPHL was a top-tier minor professional league that operated in the United States from 1963 to 1984 (from 1968 forward as the "Central Hockey League"). It was owned and operated by the National Hockey League.  The CPHL's championship trophy was called the Adams Cup in honor of the CPHL's founding president Jack Adams.

Adams Cup champions
 1964 — Omaha Knights
 1965 — St. Paul Rangers
 1966 — Oklahoma City Blazers
 1967 — Oklahoma City Blazers
 1968 — Tulsa Oilers
 1969 — Dallas Black Hawks
 1970 — Omaha Knights
 1971 — Omaha Knights
 1972 — Dallas Black Hawks
 1973 — Omaha Knights
 1974 — Dallas Black Hawks
 1975 — Salt Lake Golden Eagles
 1976 — Tulsa Oilers
 1977 — Kansas City Blues
 1978 — Fort Worth Texans
 1979 — Dallas Black Hawks
 1980 — Salt Lake Golden Eagles
 1981 — Salt Lake Golden Eagles
 1982 — Indianapolis Checkers
 1983 — Indianapolis Checkers
 1984 — (Tulsa) Oilers ‡

‡‡ Oilers team was left without a home after its owners in Tulsa went into receivership; played the last two months of the season and all playoff games as a road team, with salaries and expenses paid by the league.

References

External links
C.H.L. History 1963-1984

Awards established in 1964
Awards disestablished in 1984
1964 establishments in the United States
1984 disestablishments in the United States
Central Professional Hockey League trophies and awards